Crystallozyga is a monotypic snout moth genus. Its only species, Crystallozyga alicia, is found in the Democratic Republic of the Congo. Both the genus and species were first described by Edward Meyrick in 1937.

References

Phycitinae
Monotypic moth genera
Moths of Africa